Manbazar subdivision is a subdivision of the Purulia district in the state of West Bengal, India.

History
Purulia district was divided into four subdivisions, viz., Purulia Sadar, Manbazar, Jhalda and Raghunathpur, with effect from 6 April 2017, as per Order No. 100-AR/P/2R-2/1999 dated 30 March 2017 issued by the Government of West Bengal, in the Kolkata Gazette dated 30 March 2017.

Subdivisions
Purulia district is divided into the following administrative subdivisions:

Note: The 2011 census data has been recast as per reorganisation of the subdivisions. There may be minor variations.

Police stations
Police stations in the Manbazar subdivision have the following features and jurisdiction:

Blocks
Community development blocks in Manbazar subdivision are:

Gram panchayats
Gram panchayats in Manbazar subdivision are :
 Barabazar block: Banjora, Berada, Latpada, Tumrasole, Bansbera, Bhagabandh, Sindri, Barabazar and Dhelatbamu Sukurhutu.
 Bandwan block: Bandwan, Dhadka, Kuchia, Kumra, Chirudih, Gurur, Kuilapal and Supudih.
 Manbazar–I block: Bamni Majhihira, Chandra–Pairachali, Gopalnagar, Manbazar, Bhalubasa, Jitujuri, Baramasya–Ramnagar, Bisri, Dhanarah and Kamta Jangidiri.
 Manbazar–II block: Ankro Barakadam, Bari–Jagda, Buribandh, Kumari, Bargoria–Jamtoria, Boro Jaragara and Dighi.
 Puncha block: Bagda, Chirudih, Lakhra, Pirrah, Chandra, Jambad, Napara, Puncha, Kenda and Panipathar.

Education
Given in the table below (data in numbers) is a comprehensive picture of the education scenario in Purulia district, after reorganisation of the district in 2017, with data for the year 2013-14. (There may be minor variations because of data recasting).:

Note: Primary schools include junior basic schools; middle schools, high schools and higher secondary schools include madrasahs; technical schools include junior technical schools, junior government polytechnics, industrial technical institutes, industrial training centres, nursing training institutes etc.; technical and professional colleges include engineering colleges, medical colleges, para-medical institutes, management colleges, teachers training and nursing training colleges, law colleges, art colleges, music colleges etc. Special and non-formal education centres include sishu siksha kendras, madhyamik siksha kendras, centres of Rabindra mukta vidyalaya, recognised Sanskrit tols, institutions for the blind and other handicapped persons, Anganwadi centres, reformatory schools etc.

Educational institutions
The following institutions are located in Manbazar subdivision:
Manbhum Mahavidyalaya was established in 1986 at Manbazar.
Government General Degree College, Manbazar II at Susunia, PO Kumari, was established in 2015.
Sitaram Mahato Memorial College was established in 2015 at Kuruktopa.
Bandwan Mahavidyalaya was established in 2010 at Bandwan.
Barabazar Bikram Tudu Memorial College was established in 2006 at Barabazar.
Ramananda Centenary College was established in 1971 at Laulara.

Healthcare
The table below (all data in numbers) presents an overview of the medical facilities available and patients treated in the hospitals, health centres and sub-centres in 2014 in Purulia district, after reorganisation of the district in 2017, with data for the year 2013-14. (There may be minor variations because of data recasting).:

.* Excluding nursing homes.

Medical facilities
Medical facilities in Manbazar subdivision are as follows:

Rural Hospitals: (Name, CD block, location, beds) 
Manbazar Rural Hospital, Manbazar I CD block, Manbazar, 40 beds
Puncha Rural Hospital, Puncha CD block, Puncha, 30 beds
Bandwan Rural Hospital, Bandwan CD block, Bandwan, 30 beds
Barabazar Rural Hospital, Barabazar CD block,  Barabazar, 30 beds

Block Primary Health Centres: (Name, CD block, location, beds)
Bari Block Primary Health Centre, Manbazar II CD block, Bari, 15 beds

Primary Health Centres : (CD block-wise)(CD block, PHC location, beds)
Puncha CD block: Bagda (10), Nowagarh (PO Raj Nowagarh) (6), Anandadwip (Kuruktopa )(2)
Manbazar I CD block: Kuda (PO Mohara) (4), Pairachali (10)
Manbazar II CD block: Ankro (4), Dighi (4), Jamtoria (2), Basantapur (10)
Bandwan CD block: Chirudih (10), Latapara (2), Gurpur (6)
Barabazar CD block: Sindhri (10), Bamundiha (4)

Electoral constituencies

Lok Sabha (parliamentary) and Vidhan Sabha (state assembly) constituencies in Purulia district were as follows:

References

Subdivisions of West Bengal
Subdivisions in Purulia district
Purulia district